Unit 8200 (Yehida shmone -Matayim- "Unit eight - two hundred") is an Israeli Intelligence Corps unit of the Israel Defense Forces responsible for clandestine operation, collecting signal intelligence (SIGINT) and code decryption, counterintelligence, cyberwarfare, military intelligence, and surveillance. Military publications include references to Unit 8200 as the Central Collection Unit of the Intelligence Corps, and it is sometimes referred to as Israeli SIGINT National Unit (ISNU).  It is subordinate to Aman, the military intelligence directorate.

The unit is composed primarily of 18–21 year olds. As a result of the youth of the soldiers in the unit, and the shortness of their service period, the unit relies on selecting recruits with the ability for rapid adaptation and speedy learning. Afterschool programs for 16–18 year olds, teaching computer coding and hacking skills, also serve as feeder programs for the unit. Former Unit 8200 soldiers have, after completing their military service, gone on to founding and occupying top positions in many international IT companies and in Silicon Valley.

According to the Director of Military Sciences at the Royal United Services Institute, "Unit 8200 is probably the foremost technical intelligence agency in the world and stands on a par with the NSA in everything except scale."

History
Unit 8200 was established in 1952 using primitive surplus American military equipment. Originally, it was called the 2nd Intelligence Service Unit and then the 515th Intelligence Service Unit. In 1954, the unit moved from Jaffa to its current base at the Glilot junction.

According to Peter Roberts, the Director of Military Sciences at the Royal United Services Institute, "Unit 8200 is probably the foremost technical intelligence agency in the world and stands on a par with the NSA in everything except scale. They are highly focused on what they look at — certainly more focused than the NSA — and they conduct their operations with a degree of tenacity and passion that you don't experience elsewhere."

Overview
Unit 8200 is the largest unit in the Israel Defense Forces, comprising several thousand soldiers. It is comparable in its function to the United States' National Security Agency and is a Ministry of Defense body just as the NSA is part of the United States Department of Defense.

Subordinate to Unit 8200 is Unit Hatzav (Hebrew name for Drimia), responsible for collecting OSINT intelligence. The unit monitors and collects military intelligence–related information from television, radio, newspapers, and the internet. The translation of various items accounts for part of what is termed "basic intelligence", which is collected by the units. According to media reports, the unit provides over half of the overall intelligence information for the Israeli Intelligence Community.

The IDF's most important signal intelligence–gathering installation is the Urim SIGINT Base, a part of Unit 8200. Urim is located in the Negev desert approximately 30 km from Beersheba. In March 2004, the Commission to investigate the intelligence network following the War in Iraq recommended turning the unit into a civilian national SIGINT agency, as is in other Western countries, but this proposal was not implemented.
 
Unit 8200 is staffed primarily by 18–21 year old conscripts. Selection and recruitment to the unit usually occurs at age 18 through the IDF screening process after high school. However, the unit also scouts potential younger recruits through after-school computer classes.  These after-school computer classes, teaching 16–18 year olds computer coding and hacking skills, sometimes act as feeder programs for the unit, with students receiving invitation letters from the IDF.

The 18-year-olds selected for the unit are primarily chosen for their ability to teach themselves and to learn very quickly as the unit will only have access to their services for a short time before their military service period ends.

Activities 

In 2010, the French newspaper Le Monde diplomatique wrote that Unit 8200 operates a large SIGINT base in the Negev, one of the largest listening bases in the world, capable of monitoring phone calls, emails, and other communications, throughout the Middle East, Europe, Asia, and Africa, as well as tracking ships. Unit 8200 also reportedly maintains covert listening posts in Israeli embassies abroad, taps undersea cables, maintains covert listening units in the Palestinian territories, and has Gulfstream jets equipped with electronic surveillance equipment.

Ronen Bergman says in a 2009 book that a Hezbollah bomb, disguised as a cell phone, was picked up by agents, and taken for investigation to Unit 8200's headquarters in February 1999. Inside the laboratory the cell phone exploded. Two Unit 8200 soldiers were injured.

In 2010, The New York Times cited "a former member of the United States intelligence community" alleging that this unit used a secret kill switch to deactivate Syrian air defenses during Operation Orchard.

In 2014, 43 veterans of Unit 8200 signed a protest letter decrying what they called the electronic surveillance unit's abusive gathering of Palestinians' private information. In response, 200 other reservists signed a counter-protest letter.

According to The New York Times, the Unit 8200's hack of Kaspersky Lab allowed them to watch in real time as Russian government hackers searched computers around the world for American intelligence programs. Israelis who had hacked into Kaspersky’s own network alerted the United States to the broad Russian intrusion of US systems.

Stuxnet  
Many media reports alleged that Unit 8200 was partly or wholly responsible for the creation of the Stuxnet computer worm that in 2010 infected industrial computers, including Iranian nuclear facilities.

Duqu  
Duqu is a collection of computer malware discovered on 1 September 2011. It is alleged to be the creation of Unit 8200.

Companies founded by alumni

Former soldiers of Unit 8200 have gone on to found many IT companies, among them:

 Adallom
 AlphiMAX
 Altnext
 Argus Cyber Security
 Armis
 AudioCodes
 Axis Security
 Bizo
 Bzigo
 CardScan
 Check Point
 Claroty
 CloudEndure
 Cloudinary
 CommScope
 Crosswise
 CTERA Networks
 CTS Labs
 CyberArk
 Cybereason
 CyCognito
 Explorium
 EZchip
 Forter
 FST Biometrics
 GIDEON
 Gilat
 Hunters.Ai
 Hyperwise Security
 ICQ
 Imperva
 Incapsula
 Indeni
 Infinidat
 Infinipoint
 IntSights
 IVIX
 Lacoon Mobile Security
 Leadspace
 LEVL Technologies
 noname Security
 Namogoo
 NICE
 NSO Group
 Onavo
 Opster
 OverOps
 Palo Alto Networks
 PerimeterX
 PrimeSense
 Radware
 Rosh Intelligent Systems
 Salt Security
 Secdo
 Silverfort
 Solaredge 
 Viber
 Votiro
 Verint (spin-off from Comverse)
 Waze
 Wing Security
 Wix
 Wiz
 XenSource
 XIV
 Yonatan Labs
 ZoomInfo

See also
 List of cyber warfare forces
 Havatzalot Program – Military Intelligence Directorate training program
 IDF C4I Corps
 IDF Center for Consciousness Operations
 IDF Information Security Department
 Mamram
 IDF Computer Service Directorate
 Military Intelligence Directorate (Israel)
 Talpiot program
 Unit 81
 Technion

References

External links
 Enter Unit 8200: Israel arms for cyberwar, UPI, 11 May 2011
 Unit 8200: Israel's cyber spy agency, 10 July 2015

Military units and formations of Israel
Signals intelligence units and formations
Military Intelligence Directorate (Israel)
Israeli advanced persistent threat groups